This is a list of notable people with the surname Munda.

Politicians of India
 Arjun Munda (born 1968), Jharkhand and national politician
 Govind Chandra Munda, Odia politician
 Jaipal Singh Munda (1903–1970), politician, writer and sportsman
 Joseph Munda, West Bengali politician
 Kariya Munda (born 1936), national politician
 Koche Munda, Jharkhand politician
 Laxman Munda, Odia politician
 Nilkanth Singh Munda (born 1968), Jharkhand politician
 Sukra Munda, West Bengali politician
 Vikash Kumar Munda, Jharkhand politician

Other
 Birsa Munda (1875–1900), Indian tribal freedom fighter and religious leader
 Emilio Munda (born 1982), Italian composer and producer
 Prakash Munda (born 1991), Indian cricketer
 Ram Dayal Munda (1939–2011), Indian scholar
 Rosa Santos Munda (1918–2010), Philippina lawyer and educator
 Shanti Munda (born c. 1943), Indian communist and revolutionary leader 
 Tulasi Munda (born 1947), Indian social activist

See also
 Munda people
 Munda peoples